XHBC-FM is a radio station in Ciudad Guzmán, Jalisco, Mexico, broadcasting on 95.1 MHz FM.

History

XEBC callsign
XEBC was the former call sign of a border-blaster radio station licensed to the Tijuana / Rosarito area of Baja California, Mexico. The original XEBC, which launched in the early 1930s, was the first "border blaster" station in the Tijuana area.

In Ciudad Guzmán
The XEBC callsign returned to the air in December 1948, when Radio Ciudad Guzmán, S.A., was awarded the concession for XEBC-AM 990, serving Ciudad Guzmán with 1,000 watts day and 100 watts night. Radio Armonía became the concessionaire in 1972 and was awarded the FM combo station in 1994.

In 2016, XEBC-XHBC, along with XHIS-FM 106.3, was bought by Grupo Radiofónico ZER; ownership of the concessionaire Radio Armonía, which had been held by Guadalajara-based Unidifusión, was transferred entirely to Rodrigo Rodríguez Reyes and Josefina Reyes Sahagún. The result was a new name and brand for the station.

On March 11, 2019, Grupo Radiofónico ZER surrendered the AM frequency to the IFT, citing high costs of operation.

External links
Border Radio by Fowler, Gene and Crawford, Bill.  Texas Monthly Press, Austin. 1987 
Mass Media Moments in the United Kingdom, the USSR and the US, by Gilder, Eric. - "Lucian Blaga" University of Sibiu Press, Romania. 2003

References

Radio stations in Jalisco